Elections to Gosport Council in Hampshire, England were held on 6 May 2010.  Half of the council was up for election and the council stayed under no overall control. The Conservatives made six gains, including in some wards that they had lost in the previous election, despite having a reduced vote share. The Liberal Democrats and Labour Party lost 5 and 1 seats respectively, with Labour seeing a large increase of the total vote share.

After the election, the composition of the council was

 Conservative: 22
 Liberal Democrat: 9
 Labour: 3

Election Result

Ward Results

Alverstoke

Anglesey

Bridgemary North

Bridgemary South

Brockhurst

Christchurch

Elson

Forton

Grange

Hardway

Lee East

Lee West

Leesland

Peel Common

Privett

Rowner and Holbrook

Town

References 

G
2010